Alfredo Benavides (born April 7, 1966) is an American former Major League Baseball infielder. Benavides is now a coach with the Cincinnati Reds.

Career
Benavides was born in Laredo, Texas. He is of Mexican-American descent. He attended Texas Christian University. Drafted by the Reds in the 2nd round of the 1987 MLB amateur draft, Benavides made his Major League Baseball debut with Cincinnati on May 14, 1991.

Benavides was then a member of the inaugural Colorado Rockies team, which began play in Major League Baseball in 1993, after which he was traded to the Montreal Expos, where he played his final big league game on August 11, 1994.

During the 2007 season he spent time as interim manager of the Cincinnati Reds Rookie-Advanced farm club, the Billings Mustangs. 

He has also served as the infield coordinator of the Cincinnati Reds Minor League Teams and is also head coach of the Freddie Benavides Baseball Academy, which takes place in Laredo from late November to mid January yearly.

In 2016, following Billy Hatcher's move to third-base coach, Benavides became the first-base coach of the Cincinnati Reds.

Following the 2018 season, Benavides was named the bench coach for the 2019 Reds under their new manager David Bell.

On April 9, 2019, Benavides served as the interim manager for the Reds while current Reds manager David Bell was serving his one-game suspension after a bench-clearing incident against the Pittsburgh Pirates on April 7, 2019.

References

External links

1966 births
Living people
American baseball players of Mexican descent
American expatriate baseball players in Canada
Baseball coaches from Texas
Baseball players from Texas
Billings Mustangs managers
Cincinnati Reds coaches
Cincinnati Reds players
Colorado Rockies players
J. W. Nixon High School alumni
Major League Baseball bench coaches
Major League Baseball second basemen
Major League Baseball shortstops
Montreal Expos players
Nashville Sounds players
People from Laredo, Texas
TCU Horned Frogs baseball players
Texas Christian University alumni